Innherreds Kreditbank was a Norwegian bank based in Steinkjer.

It was founded in 1887. People involved in the foundation were solicitor Halvor Bachke Guldahl, merchant and mayor I. W. Klüwer, Jakob Gram and businessman and politician Ananias Kleven. Guldahl was the first director of the bank. Jurist and mayor Arne Falstad was later a chairman of the board.

The bank faced economic hardships in the interwar period, and became defunct in 1932.

References

Defunct banks of Norway
Companies based in Steinkjer
Banks established in 1887
Banks disestablished in 1932
1932 disestablishments in Norway
Norwegian companies established in 1887